Lukáš Lacko was the defending champion but decided not to participate.Lu Yen-hsun won the tournament after defeating Kevin Anderson 6–3, 6–4 in the final.

Seeds

Draw

Finals

Top half

Bottom half

References
 Main Draw
 Qualifying Draw

Samsung Securities Cup - Singles
2010 Singles